Stellantis Canada (formerly, FCA Canada, Inc. and Chrysler Canada) is the wholly owned subsidiary of Stellantis through its North American division operating in Canada. Incorporated in 1925, the Chrysler Corporation of Canada acquired a Maxwell-Chalmers plant in Windsor, Ontario that had been used to manufacture some Chrysler models in the previous year. Initially called Chrysler Canada, Ltd, the name of the company changed to DaimlerChrysler Canada Inc. following the merger of the two parent automotive conglomerates. In August 2007, the company was renamed Chrysler Canada Incorporated when Cerberus Capital Management purchased 80.1% of its parent company Chrysler.

FCA Canada has three manufacturing plants in operation in Canada, and built 535,878 cars and trucks in 2002. In 2007, the company sold 232,688 vehicles in the Canadian market. In 2012, Stellantis Canada sales were 243,845, a 6% increase over 2011; this put the company into the #2 sales slot for Canada.

History
FCA Canada was established in mid-June 1925, with 181 employees. 7,857 vehicles were produced in the first year.

"Plodge"
Plodge, a portmanteau of the names Plymouth and Dodge, is a name informally used to refer to vehicles Chrysler Canada built with a mix of U.S. Plymouth and Dodge parts for the Canadian and export markets. This practice allowed dealers in Canada to offer a wider array of vehicles at lower development cost in the relatively small Canadian market. For example, a Plymouth with a Dodge grille and taillights became a Dodge without the expense of tooling a vehicle for the market. On the Dodge Dart introduced in 1960, only the interiors were shared; Canadian-market 1960-61 Darts had Plymouth dashboards. The 1965 to 1966 Dodge Monaco used a Dodge body, with a Plymouth Fury dashboard and interior trim. Not all Canadian-market Chrysler-built vehicles were badge engineered in this manner, however; the DeSoto Diplomat, for example—a rebadged Dodge Dart—was never sold in Canada, where DeSotos were similar to the US models. The Canadian 1960 DeSoto Adventurer looked like the American 1960 DeSoto but used the upholstery and door panels from the 1960 Chrysler Saratoga.

 The Valiant was sold by both Dodge and Plymouth dealers as a separate make, as had been the original plan in the United States. 1960 to 1962 Canadian Valiants were substantially the same as American models, with minor trim and mechanical equipment differences. 1963-64 Canadian Valiants had U.S. Valiant front sheetmetal on the U.S. Dart body. 1965 Canadian Valiants were available in the full range of sizes and models offered across the American Valiant and Dart models, but all Canadian-market cars used Dart instrument clusters and were badged "Valiant". For 1966, the Valiant Barracuda was the only offering in Canada on the U.S. Valiant's  wheelbase, with no Valiant station wagons in Canada for 1966.

"Plodge" vehicles include:
DeSoto Diplomat: Dodge Dart body, DeSoto-like side trim
Dodge Kingsway: Dodge body, Plymouth fenders and trim
Dodge Mayfair: Dodge front clip, Plymouth body
Dodge Regent: Dodge front clip, Plymouth body
Dodge Crusader: Dodge Front Clip (grille minus six "teeth") Plymouth body
Dodge Viscount: Dodge front clip, Plymouth body
Dodge Monaco 1965-1966: Used 1965-1966 Plymouth Fury dashboard
Valiant 1960-1966: parts mix varied by model year
Dodge Dart 1960-1961: Plymouth instrument panel

Once the Canada–United States Automotive Products Agreement (the "Auto Pact") took practical effect in 1967, virtually all differences ceased to exist between U.S. and Canadian Chrysler products. However, until the early 2000s the model distribution within and among marques was sometimes different in Canada than in the U.S. The Dodge and Plymouth Neon was sold in Canada as the Chrysler Neon; the Dodge Dynasty and Intrepid were likewise both badged and sold as Chrysler models in Canada. In 2003 this practice was stopped and the U.S. and Canadian marque and model ranges are fully aligned.

Historically, Stellantis Canada sold vehicles under the Dodge, Plymouth, Chrysler, DeSoto, Valiant, and Imperial marques. Presently there are four marques: Dodge, Ram, Jeep, and Chrysler. Dodge is the mainstream car and van line, Jeep is the main SUV range, Chrysler is the premium line, and Ram is the range of trucks and truck-based SUVs.

Operations

Manufacturing plants

Stellantis Canada has other operations in Canada:

Offices
 One Riverside Drive headquarters - employs 345 in Windsor, Ontario
 Automotive Research and Development Centre - employs 200 in Windsor, Ontario
 DC Transport - employs 326 in Windsor, Ontario
 National Fleet Office - employs 16 in Mississauga, Ontario
 Eastern Business Centre - employs 37 in Mississauga, Ontario
 Quebec Business Centre - employs 24 in Montreal, Quebec
 Western Business Centre - employs 26 in Calgary, Alberta
 Atlantic Sales Branch - Moncton, New Brunswick

Parts and distribution centres
 employs 190 in Mississauga, Ontario (regional and national)
 employs 76 in Montreal, Quebec]] (closing in fall 2022)
 employs 26 in Red Deer, Alberta
 Moncton, New Brunswick (closed 2008)

References

External links
 
 Mopar Canada
 The Chrysler Canada Story (serialized history book)

Car manufacturers of Canada
Chrysler
Fiat
Stellantis
Vehicle manufacturing companies established in 1925
Companies based in Windsor, Ontario
Canadian subsidiaries of foreign companies
1925 establishments in Ontario